, or , is a Japanese national university located in Sendai, Miyagi in the Tōhoku Region, Japan. Established in 1907, it was the third Imperial University in Japan and among the first three Designated National Universities, along with the University of Tokyo and Kyoto University. Tohoku University is a Top Type university of the Top Global University Project, and since 2020 has been ranked the best university in Japan by Times Higher Education.

In 2016, Tohoku University had 10 faculties, 16 graduate schools and 6 research institutes, with a total enrollment of 17,885 students. The university's three core values are "Research First (研究第一主義)," "Open-Doors (門戸開放)," and "Practice-Oriented Research and Education (実学尊重)."

History

On June 22, 1907(明治40年,Mēji yonjyunen), the university was established under the name  by the Meiji government as the third Imperial University of Japan, following the Tokyo Imperial University (1877) and the Kyoto Imperial University (1897). From its start, it has advocated "Open-door" policies—it was the first university in Japan to accept female students (in 1913) and foreign students.

It set up the Science Department in 1911, and the Medical Department (formerly the Sendai Medical College) in 1915. In 1918 it ceded the Faculty of Agriculture to Hokkaido Imperial University. It subsequently launched Faculties of Engineering in 1919, and Law and Literature in 1922.

In 1947 the university assumed its current name, Tohoku University, and acquired a new Faculty of Agriculture. In 1949, the Faculty of Law and Literature was split to form new faculties of Law, Literature, and Economics. A Faculty of Education was added in 1949, Dentistry in 1965, and Pharmacy in 1972. Tohoku has been a National University Corporation since April 2004.

2011 Tōhoku earthquake
Subsequent to the 2011 Tōhoku earthquake and tsunami, the university was declared closed until further notice, but with a tentative re-opening date of the end of the following April.

The Aobayama, Katahira, Amamiya, and Kawauchi campuses are all at least  from the ocean, towards the mountains, and therefore suffered no damage resulting from the tsunami. No deaths or serious injuries within the faculty and student body were reported on campus grounds. However, earthquake damage lead to the closure of 27 buildings and caused millions of dollars of damage to equipment. Classes have resumed normally since early May 2011 and plans for restoring, reinforcing or replacing damaged buildings are underway.

The radiology department has been actively measuring radiation levels throughout the city of Sendai since the Fukushima Nuclear Power Plant meltdown, which is about 100 kilometers south.  So far no alarming levels of radiation have been detected.

Campuses 
 Campus locations
Principal four campuses are in the Sendai City, Japan;

Administration Unit. and Principal institutes

North-Kawauchi; The freshmen and sophomore of all undergraduates
South-Kawauchi; Law, Education, Economics, Letters

Medicine, Dentistry

Science, Engineering, Pharmacy, Agriculture

Amamiya campus and some institutes transferred to the new extension at Aobayama campus in April 2017 .

Organization 
The university's Research Center for Prediction of Earthquakes and Volcanic Eruptions is represented on the national Coordinating Committee for Earthquake Prediction.

Traditional number and configuration

(  ) is  Part-time lecturer.

Research institutes 

National Collaborative Research Institute

Tohoku Medical Megabank Organization (東北メディカル・メガバンク機構, Tōhoku Medikaru Megabanku kikō)

Centers and facilities

The 21st Century Center Of Excellence Programs

Academic rankings

Tohoku University is one of the most prestigious universities in Japan. It can be seen in the several rankings such as shown below.

General rankings
Tohoku University has been ranked first in the 2020 Times Higher Education Japan University Rankings.

According to 2011 QS World University Rankings the university rose to 70th having dropped out of the top 100 in 2010 to 102nd, and having been 97th in the 2009 THE-QS World University Rankings (in 2010 Times Higher Education World University Rankings and QS World University Rankings parted ways to produce separate rankings).

It was also ranked 49th worldwide according to the Global University Ranking in 2009.

Research performance
Tohoku University is one of the top research institutions in Japan. According to Thomson Reuters, Tohoku University is the fourth best research university in Japan. Its research excellence is especially distinctive in Materials Science (1st in Japan, third in the world), Physics (2nd in Japan, tenth in the world), Pharmacology & Toxicology (3rd in Japan, 64th in the world) and Chemistry (6th in Japan, 20th in the world).

Times Higher Education also reported that Tohoku University was ranked 3rd in Japan (201st - 250th in the world) for the World University Rankings 2022 by Subject: social sciences. The social sciences ranking includes the weightings such as Research: volume, income and reputation (accounts for 32.6 per cent) and Citations: research influence (accounts for 25 per cent).

In addition, Nature Index ranked Tohoku University as 5th in Japan (103rd in the world, 38th in Asia Pacific) on 2022 tables: Institutions.  The 2022 tables are based on Nature Index data from 1 January 2021 to 31 December 2021. Before the 2022 edition, Nature Index also ranked Tohoku University as 5th in Japan (77th in the world, 28th in Asia Pacific) on 2021 tables: Institutions, that are based on Nature Index data from 1 January 2020 to 31 December 2020.

According to the Qs World university rankings　on 2012/9 surveyed about the general standards in Engineering&Technology field, Tohoku university was placed 56th (world), fifth (national).

As Tohoku University has been emphasizing 'practical' research, Tohoku received the top place for its number of patents accepted (324) during 2009 among Japanese Universities.

Graduate school rankings
Tohoku University Law School is one of the most famous Law schools in Japan, as it was ranked fifth in the passing rate of Japanese Bar Examination in 2020.

Alumni rankings

Mines ParisTech : Professional Ranking World Universities ranks Tohoku University as 13th in the world (5th in Japan) in 2011 in terms of the number of alumni listed among CEOs in the 500 largest worldwide companies.

Popularity and selectivity
Tohoku University is one of the most selective universities in Japan. Its entrance difficulty is usually considered one of the top in Japan. Japanese journalist Kiyoshi Shimano ranks its entrance difficulty as SA (most selective/out of 11 scales) in Japan.

Evaluation from business world

People

Successive presidents

Notable people associated with Tohoku University
Many world-class celebrities have attended or served at Tohoku University.

Sciences 

Hitoshi Oshitani (押谷仁), scientist, virologist and public health expert.
Tetsuo Nozoe (野副 鉄男), chemist, known for hinokitiol.
Tsutomu Ōhashi (大橋 力), artist and scientist, Doctor of Agriculture.
Syun-Ichi Akasofu (赤祖父 俊一), geophysicist, the founding director of the International Arctic Research Center of UAF.
Hiroshi Maeda (前田 浩), pharmacologist and chemist, known for discovery of EPR effect.
Morio Kasai (葛西 森夫, 1922–2008), a surgeon who developed the Kasai procedure for biliary atresia.
Chen Wei-jao (陳維昭), a surgeon and president of National Taiwan University.
Lo Tung-bin (羅銅壁), biochemist, pioneer in the research on proteins in Taiwan.
Susumu Satomi (里見 進), a surgeon and president of Tohoku University.
Ryuta Kawashima (川島 隆太), neuroscientist, currently resident professor, the supervisor of Nintendo DS gamesofts; Brain Age: Train Your Brain in Minutes a Day! and Dr. Kawashima's Brain Training: How Old is Your Brain?
Noriko Osumi (大隅 典子), neuroscientist, the vice president of Tohoku University (2018–).
Mahmoud Nili Ahmadabadi, president of University of Tehran.

Engineering

Shintaro Uda (宇田 新太郎), an inventor of the Yagi-Uda antenna 1926, the ubiquitous television antenna.
Jun-Ichi Nishizawa (西澤 潤一), the engineer known for inventing optical communication systems including optical fiber, laser diode and so forth, PIN diode and SIT/SITh.
Fujio Masuoka (舛岡 富士雄), the developer of Flash Memory.
Masayoshi Esashi (江刺 正喜), engineer, the global authority of Microelectromechanical systems.
Toshitada Doi (土井 利忠), a pioneer in digital audio, originated Aibo the pet robot.
Fumihiko Imamura (今村 文彦), civil engineer, the natural disaster expert for NHK after 2011 Tōhoku earthquake and tsunami
Masataka Nakazawa (中沢 正隆), pioneer of optical solitons in high-speed optical communication in fiber optic networks and rare earth-doped optical amplifiers (such as EDFA).

Literature and art

Ben Goto (五島 勉), a Japanese writer.
Hayao Hamada (浜田 隼雄), a Taiwanese author.
Tadao Ooike (大池 唯雄), novelist, 1938 Naoki Prize winner.
Yō Tsumoto (津本 陽), novelist, 1978 Naoki Prize winner.
Akihiko Nakamura (中村 彰彦), novelist, 1994 Naoki Prize winner.
Kenichi Satō (佐藤 賢一), novelist, 1999 Naoki Prize winner.
Toh EnJoe (円城 塔), author, 2012 Akutagawa Prize, Nihon SF Taisho Award, and 2013 Seiun Award winner.
Yuichi Kodama (児玉 裕一), a Japanese video director.
Kazumasa Oda (小田 和正), one of the most famous musicians in pop music in Japan since the 1970s.
Kōtarō Isaka (伊坂 幸太郎), a mystery fiction writer, Japan Booksellers Award and Yamamoto Shūgorō Prize winner.
Hideaki Sena (瀬名 秀明), a science fiction writer and Nihon SF Taisho Award winner.
Chūsei Sone (曽根 中生), a Japanese film director and screenwriter.
Kenji Suzuki (鈴木 健二), an announcer of the NHK
Chinggeltei (1924–2013), a Mongolist, the former vice-rector of Inner Mongolia University

Mathematic, economics and business

Nobuhiko Kawamoto (川本 信彦), CEO of Honda Motor until 1995.
Hirofumi Uzawa (宇沢 弘文), an economist, the father of Theoretical Economics in Japan.
Su Buqing (蘇歩青), a Chinese mathematician and former president of Fudan University.
Chen Jiangong (陈建功), pioneer of modern Chinese mathematics.
Yasumasa Kanada (金田 康正), a mathematician most known for his numerous world records over the past two decades for calculating digits of π.
Shigeo Sasaki (佐々木 重夫), a professor emeritus and mathematician who introduced the Sasaki manifold

Politics

Masayuki Aoyama (青山 雅幸), Japanese politician in the House of Representatives.
Mitsuru Sakurai (桜井 充), Japanese politician of the Democratic Party of Japan.
Kenya Akiba (秋葉 賢也), a Japanese politician of the Liberal Democratic Party.
Akira Koike (小池 晃), a Japanese politician of Japanese Communist Party.
Nori Sasaki (佐々木 紀), Japanese politician of the Democratic Party of Japan.
Yoshihisa Inoue (井上 義久), Japanese politician of the New Komeito Party.
Emiko Okuyama (奥山 恵美子), Mayor of Sendai, 2009–2017.

See also
 Tohoku Mathematical Journal
 Institute for Materials Research
 Sendai
 List of National Treasures of Japan (writings)
 Tegula kusairo

References

External links

Tohoku University
Annual review
Links

 
Buildings and structures in Sendai
Japanese national universities
National Seven Universities
Universities and colleges in Miyagi Prefecture
Educational institutions established in 1907
1907 establishments in Japan